Serhiy Dmytrovych Prytula (born 22 June 1981) is a Ukrainian public and political figure, who gained his popularity as a TV presenter and actor. Since the full-scale Russian invasion of Ukraine he has focused on fundraising money for the needs of the Armed Forces of Ukraine. His most famous campaign was People's Bayraktar (and the purchase of a satellite).

Biography

Early life and education
Serhiy was born on June 22, 1981 in the city of Zbarazh, Ternopil Oblast.

In 1997, he received 2nd place for the defense of scientific works of the Small Academy of Sciences of Ukraine. Serhiy graduated from school with a gold medal and entered the Ternopil Academy of National Economy (now West Ukrainian National University).

During his studies at the academy, Serhiy was an active participant of several youth organizations. Together with an affinity group, Serhiy established an informal union of “Artists”.

Broadcasting career 
In 1998, Prytula past casting for the position of a broadcaster and in January 1999, he appeared on “Radio Ternopil 106.1 FM” under the nickname Siryi, meaning “Grey”.
In 1999, Serhiy paid for a course in one of London's colleges and passed the first exam session externally. In 2000-2001, he studied in London.

Disappointed with studying, Prytula started working. He went through all the stages while working in London: from a builder and loader to a waiter and cook's helper.

Having returned to Ternopil, he occupied the position of Student Dean of the Institute, and resumed work on "Radio Ternopil".

Prytula has hosted the morning show “Pidiom” (eng. “Wake up!”) and the talent-show “Ukraine Does not Believe in Tears” on Novyi Kanal.

From 2017 to 2020, Prytula served as a host of Vidbir, Ukraine's national selection for the Eurovision Song Contest.

Real Comedy 
Between 2006 and 2009, Prytula was a regular participant of Real Comedy, where he cultivated a sarcastic image from sharply addressing Ukrainian celebrities.

Political career
From 2019 to 2021, he co-operated with the party Holos, running for the parliament election in 2019 and for the post of mayor of Kyiv in 2020.

Prytula took part in the July 2019 Ukrainian parliamentary election with the party Holos, but election results allowed only 17 members of the party to become MPs, while Prytula was 30th. He was a member of the political council of the party from April 2020 until February 2021.

Prytula was the candidate of Holos for the post of Mayor of Kyiv in the 2020 Kyiv local election. In the election he received less than 8% of the votes (in total he received 56,900 votes), securing third place but losing the election to incumbent Mayor Vitali Klitschko who was re-elected in the first round of the election with 50.52% of the votes.

Prytula left Holos in June 2021, but emphasized that he did not leave politics. He claimed the party had "moved so far away from our initial principles."

In late September 2021, Prytula stated that he was working to create his own political party. In February 2022, Prytula and supporters stated to collect signatures for the establishment of his new political party, 24 August.

Fundraiser for the AFU
Since February 24, 2022, Prytula has been coordinating a volunteer supply center for the Ukrainian Ground Forces and civilian volunteers during the Russian invasion of Ukraine.

As of April 2022, Prytula fundraised over ₴200 million to help the Armed Forces of Ukraine (AFU).

On June 22, 2022, Prytula started the fundraising campaign “People's Bayraktar” for 500 million UAH for 3 Bayraktar TB2 for the Ukrainian army, and crowdfunded 600 million UAH in just 3 days.

As of 15 July, Prytula had raised for the AFU more than $34 million dollars.

18 of August 2022 ICEYE signed a contract with the Serhiy Prytula Charity Foundation that would give the Armed Forces of Ukraine access to one of its satellites.

On 2nd November 2022, The Serhiy Prytula Charity Foundation organised a $5.5m “Grab them all” crowdfunding appeal to buy 50 used ex-British military FV103 Spartan APCs (armoured personnel carriers) for the Ukraine army, a fast small tracked vehicle ideal for muddy and snowy conditions of the frontline in the south of Ukraine. Within a day, the money was pledged.

See also 

 Come Back Alive
 United24

References

External links 
 Official page of Serhiy Prytula
Official Facebook page
Official YouTube channel
Charity Foundation Serhiy Prytula

Ukrainian male comedians
Ukrainian male television actors
Ukrainian television presenters
People from Zbarazh
1981 births
Living people
Ternopil National Economic University alumni
Voice (Ukrainian political party) politicians
Recipients of the Order of Merit (Ukraine), 3rd class
Ukrainian actor-politicians